Bucolion stygius is a species of cockroach found in South America. It is the sole species in the genus Bucolion.

References

Cockroaches